Meifu Shinkage-ryū is a modern Shurikenjutsu-School, which was founded in the 1970s by Chikatoshi Someya (Someya Chikatoshi). Its roots could mainly be found in the Shurikenjutsu of Tenshin Shōden Katori Shintō-ryū.

Description 
The Meifu Shinkage-ryū is a modern school of Shurikenjutsu. Someya was a student of Yoshio Sugino of the Katori Shintō-ryū, although the throwing style used in Meifu Shinkage-ryū is different. Someya refined the Katori style of throwing, making it shorter, faster and more concealed.

The Meifu Shinkage-ryū is a small school of about 30 students who train in Tōkyō, Japan under the instruction of the present sōke, Yasuyuki Ōtsuka.
This school is almost entirely composed of students of other martial arts schools. Ōtsuka welcomes students from any art or country. Currently around 200 international students train in Meifu Shinkage-ryū (Ōtsuka, personal communication October 18, 2016), divided in official Branches and Keikokai (study groups). Ōtsuka calls himself a "shuriken teacher and researcher."
There is a specific kind of shuriken called a Meifu Shinkage-ryū shuriken, but Ōtsuka teaches and students will often practice throwing shuriken from many different schools, most of which are now extinct.

Techniques 
Shurikenjutsu
 Kamae
 Shizentai
 Chudan no Kamae
 Gedan no Kamae
 Jodan no Kamae
 Waza
 Shomen Uchi
 Gyaku Uchi
 Dosoku Uchi
 Shitate Uchi
 Za Uchi
 Aruki Uchi
 Hashiri Uchi
 Ne Uchi

Fundō Kusarijutsu
 Kamae
 Fuko
 Zanshin
 Osame
 Hikitori
 Waza
 Metsubushi
 Yokomen Uchi
 Yokoichi Monji
 Kesa Uchi
 Hachinoji Uchi

Dōjō 
 Japan: Tōkyō (Honbu Dōjō), Ōsaka
 USA: California - Arizona - Illinois - New Jersey
 Spain: Barcelona - Valencia
 Germany: Bremen
 Austria: Langenlebarn
 Finland: Helsinki
 Great Britain: Leeds - London - Nottingham South East
 Russia: Moskau
 Czech Republic: Prague
 Netherlands: Haarlem/Amsterdam - Eindhoven
 Italy
 Mexico
 Chile
 Australia: Melbourne
 Canada: Ontario, Saskatchewan, Manitoba
 Sweden

References 

 Someya, Chikatoshi (1982) Shuriken-Jutsu Nyumon 
 Someya, Chikatoshi (1985) Kakushibuki-Jutsu Nyumon
 Someya, Chikatoshi (1987) Shuriken-Jutsu 
 Someya, Chikatoshi (2001) Shuriken-Jutsu 
 Someya, Chikatoshi (2004) Shuriken Giho 
 Ôtsuka, Yasuyuki (2004) Shuriken Jutsu no Susume 
 Ôtsuka, Yasuyuki (2010) How to learn Meifu Shinkage-ryu
 Ôtsuka, Yasuyuki (2011) Meifu Shinkage Ryu - Fundô-kusarijutsu & Shurikenjutsu 
 Ôtsuka, Yasuyuki (2015) Meifu Shinkage Ryu - Fundô Kusarijutsu - Shurikenjutsu (2nd edition)
 Interview with Sōke Yasuyuki Ôtsuka by Thomas Feldmann in the German martial arts magazine Toshiya No. 1, 2010
 Meifu Shinkage Ryu Shurikenjutsu Suomessa Bodo-Magazine Budoka No. 1, 2009 (Finnish)

DVDs and videos 
 Someya, Chikatoshi (1987) Meifu-Shinkage-ryu Shuriken Jutsu
 Someya, Chikatoshi (1992) Shurikenjutsu and Kusarijutsu
 Ōtsuka, Yasuyuki (2004) Hiden! Shurikenjutsu

External links

Gendai budo